Yunnanolepis is an extinct genus of primitive antiarch placoderm. The fossils of the various species are found in Early to Middle Devonian strata in Southern China (Xishancun, Lianhuashan and Xitun Formations).

External links 
 Yunnanolepis at the Paleobiology Database

Antiarchi
Placoderm genera
Placoderms of Asia
Lochkovian life
Fossils of China
Paleontology in Yunnan
Fossil taxa described in 1963